Chloroacetone is a chemical compound with the formula . At STP it is a colourless liquid with a pungent odour.  On exposure to light, it turns to a dark yellow-amber colour. It was used as a tear gas in World War I.

Synthesis
Chloroacetone may be synthesized from the reaction between chlorine and diketene, or by the chlorination of acetone.

Applications
Chloroacetone is used to make dye couplers for colour photography, and is an intermediate in chemical manufacturing. It is also used in the Feist-Benary synthesis of furans.

Reaction of phenoxide with chloroacetone gives phenoxyacetone, which is used to make a wide variety of different pharmaceuticals. A catalytic amount of potassium iodide is also necessary to facilitate a Finkelstein reaction.

Purification
Chloroacetone purchased from commercial suppliers contains 5% impurities including mesityl oxide, which is not removed by distillation. Mesityl oxide can be oxidized using acidified KMnO4 to form a diol (followed by separation with ether), which is removed on subsequent distillation.

Transportation regulations
Transportation of unstabilized chloroacetone has been banned in the United States by the US Department of Transportation.  Stabilized chloroacetone is in hazard class 6.1 (Poison Inhalation Hazard). Its UN number is 1695.

See also
Bromoacetone
Dichloroacetone
Fluoroacetone
Hexachloroacetone
Use of poison gas in World War I

References

External links
 The Halogenation of Carbonyls

Organochlorides
Lachrymatory agents
World War I chemical weapons
Ketones